Yuzui Yangtze River Bridge is a suspension bridge spanning  over the Yangtze River near Yuzuizhen, Chongqing, China.

See also
List of longest suspension bridge spans
Yangtze River bridges and tunnels

References

Bridges in Chongqing
Bridges completed in 2009
Suspension bridges in China
Bridges over the Yangtze River